The Marshal (German: Marschall) was the highest military rank in the Austrian monarchy.

Babenberg Marshals
Otto before 1177
Albero 1177–1197
Dietmar 1200–1203
Ulrich of Falkenstein-Neuburg 1207–1217
Henry I of Kuenring 1217–1233

After the death of Leopold VI, Duke of Austria in 1230, the Kuenrings kept the title Marshal of Austria until being forcibly removed by the Habsburgs.

Habsburg Marshals

Land Marshals
Herman of Landenberg 30 January 1282 – 10 December 1306
Dietrich of Pilichdorf 3 March 1303 – 25 December 1326
Ulrich, Count of Pfannberg 30 December 1330 – 23 October 1354
Herman of Landenberg 3 November 1358 – 8 July 1360
Leutold of Stadeck 18 July 1360 – 16 January 1367
Frederick of Walsee 15 June 1367 – 3 May 1368
Haidenreich of Meissau 15 July 1368 – deposed before 17 March 1375
Bernhard of Meissau 17 March 1375 – 7 July 1377
Heidenreich of Meissau reinstated 18 December 1378 – 26 November 1380
Rudolf of Walsee before 1 May 1384 – 2 February 1397
Urich of Dachsberg 25 July 1397 – 1 April 1402
Frederick of Walsee 6 February 1403 – 21 April 1405 
John, Burgrave of Maidburg 15 February 1406 – 6 August 1406
Otto of Meissau 2 January 1407 – before 25 December 1407
Hartnid of Pottendorf 16 June 1409 – 25 December 1407
Pilgrim of Puchaim before 5 June 1417 – 8 August 1422
John, Count of Schaunberg 23 June 1424 – 4 December 1424 deposed
Hans of Winden 6 June 1425 – 11 November 1425
Hans of Ebensdorf 28 June 1427 – 12 May 1433 
John, Count of Schaunberg reinstated 28 May 1437 – before 30 May 1439
Rüdiger of Starhemberg 9 February 1441 – before 28 July 1446
Bernhard, Count of Schaunberg 7 July 1447 – 4 April 1459
George of Kuenring 3 April 1460 – 1464
George of Pottendorf 31 January 1467 – 30 October 1471
Michael, Burgrave of Maidburg 18 September 1475 – 24 March 1483
Christoph of Liechtenstein 16 June 1488 – 1501

Under Marshals
Michael the Uttendorfer 24 August 1386 – 15 June 1396
Nicholas the Pottenbrunner 1397
Gottfried of Wildungsmauer 25 January 1403 – 18 June 1404 
Egyd the Wolfsteiner 1405
Plankenstainer 1406
Hans the Greissenecker 1409
George the Uttendorfer 1413
Hans the Walich 1420–1433
Albert the Wolfenreuter 1420–1433
George the Pottenbrunner 1420–1433
Hans Stockhorner 9 February 1438 – 27 October 1439
Hans Walich 12 December 1442 – 28 October 1444
Marchart Kerspeger 1445
Wolfgang Oberhaimer 1454
Leopold Wulzendorfer 31 January 1467 – 28 April 1477
Wolfgang Dörr 16 June 1488 and again on 26 June 1489
Caspar Schaul zu Molt 10 March 1494 – 1 May 1497

Bibliography
 

Marshals of Austria